Hill 60 is a World War I battlefield memorial site and park in the Zwarteleen area of Zillebeke south of Ypres, Belgium. The site comprises two areas of raised land separated by the railway line; the northern area was known by soldiers as Hill 60 while the southern part was known as The Caterpillar.

Background

Origin

The high ground of Hill 60, south of Zillebeke, was created in the 1850s by spoil dumped from the cutting for the railway line between Ypres and Comines. The line opened in March 1854 and formed part of the La Madeleine–Comines railway from the French Nord-Pas-de-Calais region into Belgian Flanders.

The earth excavated during the building of the railway was dumped on either side of the embankment and formed hillocks. On the west side, a long irregular mound atop the ridge was called The Caterpillar and a smaller mound  down the slope towards Zillebeke, was known as The Dump. Artillery-fire and mine explosions during the war changed the shape of the hill and flattened it considerably. Today the peak of Hill 60 is only about  higher than the land in the vicinity.

Roads run north-west to south-east through the area, from Ypres to Verbrandenmoelen and Hollebeke as well as from Zillebeke to Zwartelen and Zandvoorde.

First World War

1914

November

During the First World War, Hill 60 was a small promontory on the edge of the Ypres Salient, with good views for the Germans across the British lines into Ypres, which gave it great tactical significance. During the First Battle of Ypres in late 1914, Hill 60 was held by the Moussy Detachment (General Vidal), which had been depleted by the transfer of three battalions to Langemarck. On 11 November, during the Battle of Nonne Bosschen, the detachment repulsed German attacks until noon, when the left flank units of the German 30th Division forced the French back to Hill 60 and Verbrandenmolen. No French or British reserves or reinforcements were available until the French 7th Hussars dismounted at Zillebeke and counter-attacked, carrying the remaining infantry of the detachment along in the rush. The French line was re-established from a bridge near Voormezeele to Verbrandenmolen and Zwarteleen, which was still only  from Ypres. The German account recorded that Hill 60 had been captured but Lieutenant-General Dubois (the  commander) and other witnesses denied this. When British troops relieved the French in the area on the night of  1915, the hill was certainly held by the Germans.

1915

Second Battle of Ypres

On 17 February 1915, British sappers blew a small mine at Hill 60 which they had taken over from the French, but without great effect. The Germans retaliated with a small mine at Zwarteleen but were driven out of the British positions. On 21 February, however, they blew a large mine nearby, killing forty-seven men and ten officers of the 16th Lancers. In the spring of 1915, there was constant underground fighting in the Ypres Salient at Hooge, Hill 60, Railway Wood, Sanctuary Wood, St Eloi and The Bluff which required the deployment of new drafts of tunnellers for several months after the formation of the first eight tunnelling companies of the Royal Engineers.

After the Battle of Gravenstafel Ridge  the British planned a local withdrawal to less exposed positions, roughly  distant from Ypres. The new line was to run from Hill 60 northwards to Hooge on the Ypres–Menin road, thence to Frezenberg Ridge, Mouset  rap Farm and then back to the Ypres–Yser canal. Large working parties from the 28th Division and the 50th (Northumbrian) Division began to dig the new line under cover of darkness and the retirement from the eastern side of the salient took place on the night of  during the Battle of St. Julien  The 27th Division took over the area from just west of Hill 60, to about  short of the Ypres–Roulers railway. The Germans followed up their success by attacking again at the Battle of Frezenberg Ridge  which gained Frezenberg, Verlorenhoek and the vicinity but attacks south of the Menin road gained very little ground.

Capture of Hill 60

In spring 1915, earlier French preparations to raid the hill were continued by the British 28th Division, which took over the line in February 1915 and then by the 5th Division (Major-General Thomas Morland). The Allied plan to attack Hill 60 was expanded into an ambitious attempt to capture the hill, despite advice that Hill 60 could not be held unless The Caterpillar nearby was also occupied. A French  mine gallery under the hill was extended by experienced miners from Northumberland and Wales, after it was found that Hill 60 was the only place in the area not waterlogged.

In the first attack of the newly formed Royal Engineer tunnelling companies in the Ypres Salient, the 173rd Tunnelling Company laid six mines by 10 April 1915, an operation planned by Major-General Edward Bulfin, commander of the 28th Division and continued by the 5th Division after the 28th Division was relieved. The attack began on 17 April and the 5th Division captured the area quickly with only seven casualties but found that the new salient made permanent occupation of the hill very costly.

Loss of Hill 60

The gas arrived so quickly that most of the British were unable to put on their improvised respirators. As soon the gas arrived, the Germans attacked from the flanks with bombing parties and artillery laid a barrage on the British approaches to the hill. Some of the British returned fire and reinforcements arrived by rushing through the gas cloud and bombing parties forced the Germans back. The original garrison lost many casualties in standing their ground, including many gas casualties.

The 5th Division held the hill on a  front with the 15th Brigade on 5 May, when the Germans discharged gas from two places opposite the hill at  The wind blew the gas along, rather than across, the British defences and only one sentry was able to sound the gas alarm. The British defence plan required troops under gas attack to move to the flanks but the course of the gas cloud made this impossible. The gas hung so thick that it was impossible to remain in the trenches and troops who stood their ground were overcome. The German 30th Division advanced fifteen minutes after the gas cloud and occupied nearly all of the front line on the lower slope of the hill.

The right flank of the Zwarteleen Salient was overrun, which increased the gap left by the first discharge; a few men on the left delayed the German infantry until  when a battalion advanced through the gas cloud and an artillery barrage. Constant counter-attacks forced some of the Germans back and regained several lost trenches. At  the 13th Brigade arrived and attacked at  after a short bombardment the darkness, state of the ground and alert German infantry repulsed the attack, except for a party which reached the top of the hill, then withdrew at  under enfilade-fire from the Caterpillar and Zwarteleen, which made the hill untenable. Both sides were exhausted and spent the next day digging-in. At dawn on 7 May, the British attacked with two companies of infantry and attached "bombers" using hand grenades, all of whom were killed or captured. From  1915, the British had  in the Second Battle of Ypres and the fighting for Hill 60.

December

On 19 December 1915, the 50th Division was due to relieve the 9th (Scottish) Division from Hill 60 to near the Menin Road, an area where skirmishing, raiding and mining by both sides never stopped. At  a German artillery and gas bombardment began on the north side of the Ypres salient and the gas reached the 50th Division positions behind the 9th Division, which forced the men to don their eye protectors but not gas helmets. German artillery-fire fell all round the salient and at noon the 50th Division received an order to stand down, as the attack had been limited to the areas of the 6th Division and 49th Division further north. The German bombardment continued all day but the relief took place in the evening, with the 149th Brigade taking over on the right, just west of Hill 60 with the 5th and 6th battalions, Northumberland Fusiliers, in positions only a few feet from German advanced posts; Christmas Day was spent in cold, mud and under showers of rain.

1916

February–March

Maintaining field fortifications in the Ypres Salient over the winter of 1915–1916 was an endless task, as trenches flooded and collapsed, dugouts were swamped and communications were cut. Immediate repairs were necessary but had to be done at night, under constant harassing fire. Artillery and snipers from both sides were always active and patrols went out each night. Mining and counter-mining was constant, which kept trench garrisons under permanent strain, in fear of explosions which could occur anywhere without warning. Aircraft of both sides were overhead, except in the foulest weather, flying contact-patrol, photographic reconnaissance and artillery-observation sorties. On 12 February, two German raids were made on the 50th Division north of Hill 60 and on 14 February, the Germans attacked at Hooge against the 24th Division, on the left flank, which included a bombardment of trenches  and  Hill 60.

An explosion at  near the end of  blew up a bombing sap, killed  and wounded another four; small raiding parties appeared but were shot down in no man's land. In the area of the 17th (Northern) Division on the right flank at The Bluff, the Germans took the front line held by the 51st Brigade, which fell back to the support line and made a counter-attack 15 February, which failed. For the rest of February the area around Hill 60 returned to "normal" siege warfare but preparations were made secretly to recapture The Bluff. The 50th Division participated in artillery-bombardments, grenade attacks and trench mortaring to convince the Germans that an attack was being prepared against Hill 60, demonstrations which continued into March.

April
At  on 9 April, German artillery began a bombardment until  obliterated most of the front line, isolated the right flank battalions and blew in the entrances to the tunnel leading to the British mining system.

The survivors counter-attacked and then chased the raiding party into no man's land assisted by the right-hand company. Other German troops broke into the positions of the 11th Battalion Sherwood Foresters and reached the Deep Support Line  further back. In the mêlée one of the tunnel entrances was cleared but troops posted to guard it were killed by a shell and German troops threw gas bombs into the gallery until some of the troops inside burst out and drove the Germans back with hand grenades. On the right flank raiders ran up Marshall Lane, parallel to the railway, bombed the entrances to subways and got close to the main mine shafts, just as reinforcements arrived from Battersea Farm and recaptured the lane.

May
From  the 50th Division returned to the front line from reserve and resumed the struggle for fire supremacy. The British gradually suppressed the German artillery but found that German trench mortar crews were much harder to defeat, particularly those manning a trench howitzer who fired  bursts, which were unusually destructive and then took cover. The divisional artillery retaliated immediately but never managed to destroy the gun. By frequent night patrols and raids the division gained control of no man's land but German mining continued with intermittent success and a gas attack was carried out by the Germans on the night of

1917

April–May
At the end of April the 19th (Western) Division received orders for the 57th Brigade to relieve the 70th Brigade of the 23rd Division at Hill 60 and for the 58th Brigade to take over at Hooge. On the night of  the 57th Brigade took over with the 10th Royal Warwicks (10th Warwicks) on the right, 10th Worcesters in the centre, 8th North Staffs on the left and the 8th Gloucesters in reserve at the Railway Dugouts. The Warwicks reported that much movement was seen in the German lines and that two officers on the Caterpillar with maps and sheets of paper, were thought to be sketching the British lines at  In front of the Caterpillar, sandbags and two trees with white painted blobs could be seen facing the British lines. British units on the flanks were alerted and at  a German artillery and machine-gun bombardment began.

No raiders appeared and at  the British stood down. At  on 10 May another bombardment fell on the 10th Warwicks and telephone communication with the battalion was lost. Scouts went forward and saw that the supporting positions were secure and the divisional artillery responded promptly to an SOS flare as rifle and machine-gun fire was opened by the British infantry. After the end of the German bombardment, the six man Lewis-gun squad in number 2 post of D Company, were found to be missing. The rest of the D Company posts were badly damaged and those of C Company were found undamaged. The C Company support line had been blown in, with several casualties. The British concluded that the vigilance of the 57th Brigade had prevented a big raid on the 8th Gloucesters who had taken over from the 10th Worcesters in the centre on the night of

June: Battle of Messines 

After the Battle of Hill 60 (April–May 1915), Tunnelling companies of the Royal Engineers (RE) took up mining operations under the hill and the neighbouring ground on a much more ambitious scale. Deep mining under the German galleries beneath Hill 60 began in late August 1915, with the 175th Tunnelling Company, which began a gallery  behind the British front line and passed  beneath the German positions. The British underground works consisted of an access gallery (Berlin Tunnel) leading to two mine chambers, Hill 60 A (beneath Hill 60) and Hill 60 B (beneath The Caterpillar), to be loaded with explosives and detonated at the appointed time. The 3rd Canadian Tunnelling Company took over in April 1916 and completed the galleries, the Hill 60 mine being charged with explosives in July 1916 and the branch gallery under The Caterpillar in October.

The 1st Australian Tunnelling Company took over in November 1916 and maintained the mines beneath Hill 60 and The Caterpillar over the winter and months of underground fighting until June 1917, when they were fired along with the rest of the mines under Messines Ridge at the beginning of the Battle of Messines.

The Battle of Messines was conducted by the British Second Army (General Herbert Plumer) and forced the German army to move reserves to Flanders from the Arras and Aisne fronts, which relieved pressure on the French. The objective of the attack was to capture the German defences on the ridge, which ran from Ploegsteert Wood in the south through Messines and Wytschaete to Mount Sorrel and deprive the 4th Army of the high ground south of Ypres. The ridge commanded the British defences and back areas further north, from which the British intended to conduct the "Northern Operation", an advance to Passchendaele Ridge, then capture the Belgian coast up to the Dutch frontier.

1918

Battle of the Lys

During the German Spring Offensive, the 9th (Scottish) Division lost  of its infantry and was transferred to Flanders,  to hold a quiet front while recovering from its losses and incorporating fresh drafts from Britain. (Hill 60 was well behind the front line, having been captured during the Battle of Messines in June 1917.)

The ground north of the canal was considered the most vulnerable to attack, since it was the southern flank of the Passchendaele Salient and Zandvoorde Ridge provided cover for troops concentrating to attack Klein Zillibeke Spur and Hill 60. South of the canal was a reserve line of well-wired posts towards The Stables to the south-west, backed by the White Château on a commanding rise, which had been fortified. From The Stables, two thick belts of barbed wire ran south-east and south-west, behind which were some posts with scratch garrisons, due to the need adequately to garrison Hill 60, The Bluff and White Château.

Fifth Battle of Ypres

The 35th Division came into line opposite the hill in early September and commenced patrols and raids into the German lines opposite on 4 September. On 13 September, there was an increase in German artillery-fire and on 15 September, the division advanced  closer to the hill in a night attack, against variable opposition from the 40th Saxon Division On 28 September, the Second Army attacked with the Belgian Army to the north and the 35th Division met little opposition from the Germans opposite,  whom surrendered. The 104th Brigade advanced in the centre of the division and met only slight opposition in its advance east of Hill 60 and The Caterpillar. By  the Brigade had reached a line from Klein Zillebeke to Canada Tunnels.

Post-war

In 1920, Hill 60 was bought by Lieutenant-Colonel Cawston who later sold a half share in it to John J Calder a prominent Scottish brewer whose son Capt. James Calder (Lovat Scouts) was awarded the Military Cross for action there. In 1930, Calder donated his share of Hill 60 to the Imperial War Graves Commission (now Commonwealth War Graves Commission), which maintains it as a battlefield memorial park.

World War II

1940
Twenty-two years after the end of World War I, the area at Hill 60 was fought over again when the 17th Brigade of the British 5th Infantry Division stopped the advance of three German divisions from  1940, which saved the British Expeditionary Force (BEF) during the Second World War. The hill was subjected to a tremendous mortar and artillery barrage (Coy HQ in and around the concrete bunker near the top of the hill) and there was hand-to-hand fighting on the nearby Zwarteleen crossroads, when a fighting patrol from 2nd RSF set off to destroy German machine gun and mortar positions there. The patrol enabled the evacuation of the defences on the railway, a withdrawal to the canal line and a general withdrawal towards St Eloi, Kemmel and Dikkebus. Other companies of the 2nd RSF held the railway line between Hill 60 and the canal bridge. The 2nd Inniskillings were to their right and rear, on the main road, D Company of the 2nd RSF was in reserve and the 6th Seaforths held "the Dump". Constant attacks by three German divisions were repulsed during 28 May, which reduced the two 5th Division brigades to  each and exhausted the artillery ammunition of I Corps. The division held the "Dunkirk corridor" open for another day, which saved II Corps and the rest of the BEF. Thousands more troops were able to withdraw into the Dunkirk perimeter and the 5th Division then moved to the Yser with the 42nd Division, to fill the gap left when the Belgian army capitulated.
During this action the large WW1 constructed observation bunker was also badly damaged by German PAK anti tank gun munitions and the Queen Victoria's Rifles Memorial was so badly damaged it later required reconstruction.

1944

Pierre Marchant and Lucien Olivier, members of the French resistance from La Madeleine (now a suburb of Lille), were shot by German soldiers near Hill 60 on 2 September 1944, after trying to escape from a prisoner transport train. Marchant and Olivier had been driving a lorry loaded with munitions for the Resistance in their home town when they were arrested by the SS and put on a train to Belgium. When their train stopped between Zillebeke and Hollebeke to await the arrival of an extra engine from Ypres, to haul the train over the incline, Marchant and Olivier were killed by the Germans and their bodies thrown off the train. Marchant and Olivier were buried temporarily at Zillebeke and repatriated to France after the war. A memorial was erected near the railway line at Hill 60 in 1969, which was refurbished and rededicated in the presence of their family members in 2004.

Later history

Hill 60 and The Caterpillar are designated a battlefield memorial site and open to the public. The area was merged into the municipality of Zillebeke in 1970 and into the city of Ypres in 1976. In spring 2015, extensive repairs were carried out at the memorial park.

Memorials

There are several memorials on Hill 60, that to the Australian Tunnelling Companies, that to Queen Victoria's Rifles, that to the 14th (Light) Division, and to French resistance fighters killed here during the Second World War. It is also known that at least one veteran of World War I, Mr P. G. Arnold from Birmingham, had asked his widow to scatter his ashes here after his death in 1931.

Hill 60 Battlefield Memorial Park
In the collapsed tunnels beneath Hill 60, many British and German dead are buried. The Belgian government made the hill and the surrounding enclosure a battlefield memorial site and to preserve it, far as nature permits, in the state in which it was left after World War I. The park at the memorial site is maintained by the Commonwealth War Graves Commission (CWGC). The memorial park also has the remains of several bunkers and craters from the fighting from 1915–1917. A large concrete bunker in the centre of the site is preserved almost as it was found at the end of the war. This bunker was originally German, but modified by the Australians in 1918.

Also on Hill 60 is a stone plaque which gives the following summary,

Queen Victoria's Rifles Memorial
The memorial to the Queen Victoria's Rifles (9th Battalion The London Regiment) is located within the Hill 60 Battlefield Memorial Park. It was replaced after the original was damaged during the Second World War. On the night of 20–21 April 1915, Second Lieutenant Geoffrey Harold Woolley and a handful of men were the only defenders on the hill and continually repelled attacks on their position. He encouraged the men to hold the line against heavy enemy machine gun fire and shellfire. For a time he was the only officer on the hill. When he and his men were relieved on the morning of 21 April only 14 out of a company of 150 had survived. For his gallantry he was awarded the Victoria Cross, the first to be awarded to a Territorial Force officer.

The Queen Victoria's Rifles (QVR) had arrived in Le Havre on 5 November 1914 and were one of the first Territorial battalions to serve in France; they were attached to the 5th Division. On 17 April 1915, an attack was mounted on Hill 60 by the 13th Infantry Brigade which included the 2nd King’s Own Scottish Borderers, the 2nd Duke of Wellington’s West Riding Regiment, the 1st Queen’s Own Royal West Kent Regiment, the 2nd King’s Own Yorkshire Light Infantry and the Queen Victoria's Rifles (9th London Regiment). Prior to the attack, the hill had been undermined with five galleries being driven under the German positions. The plan was to detonate the mines under the hill to destroy the enemy and their positions, after which the 13th Infantry Brigade would occupy the area. Hill 60 was captured on 17 April 1915 and on 20 April, two and a half companies of the QVRs were ordered up to the front line as the enemy made a counter-attack. At dawn on 21 April 1915, the Germans began bombarding the QVRs with hand grenades. Casualties were heavy, including two officers, Major Lees and Lieutenant Summerhays, who were killed. It was then that Woolley left a position of safety to take command of the soldiers on Hill 60. The QVRs remained in France for the rest of the war and their losses are remembered at Hill 60 by the QVR memorial and at the nearby QVR café and museum.

1st Australian Tunnelling Company Memorial

This memorial commemorates the men of the 1st Australian Tunnelling Company who gave their lives in the tunnelling and defensive operations in this area from 1915–1918. The memorial is located next to the entrance gate of the Hill 60 Battlefield Memorial Park. The inscription reads

14th (Light) Division Memorial
This memorial commemorates the men of the 14th (Light) Division who gave their lives in fighting in this area from 1915–1918. The memorial is located outside the Hill 60 Battlefield Memorial Park, between the 1st Australian Tunnelling Company Memorial and the French Resistance Memorial.

French Resistance Memorial
This memorial commemorates Pierre Marchant and Lucien Olivier, two members of the French resistance from La Madeleine (now a suburb of Lille) who were killed here by Germans on 2 September 1944. A memorial to Marchant and Olivier was erected in 1969. It was refurbished and rededicated in the presence of their family members in 2004. The memorial is located outside the Hill 60 Battlefield Memorial Park, in between the 14th (Light) Division Memorial and the bridge over the railway tracks between Hill 60 and The Caterpillar.

Popular culture
 Beneath Hill 60: a 2010 Australian war film, directed by Jeremy Sims and written by David Roach, tells the story of the 1st Australian Tunnelling Company. The screenplay is based on an account written by Captain Oliver Woodward, who is portrayed by Brendan Cowell.
 The standing area on the railway end of Croke Park, Dublin, Ireland was formerly a mound of earth known as "Hill 60." It was later decided inappropriate to have a stand named after a British Army battleground, so it was renamed "Hill 16" after the 1916 Rising.

Gallery

Landscape

Fortifications

See also

 Mines in the Battle of Messines (1917)
 List of World War I memorials and cemeteries in Flanders

Notes

Footnotes

References

Further reading

External links

 Photo essay
 Hill 60 Memorial and its History
 Introduction to Hill 60
 Tunnels at Hill 60
 New York Times, 21 April 1915
 Ieper: The Second Battle of Ypres April 1915 Account of events at Hill 60
 First World War.com – Feature Articles – The Capture of Hill 60 in 1915
 Beneath Hill 60, film
 Upclose: The man that went Beneath Hill 60
 Australian Official History, Appendix No. 1, The Mines at Hill 60
 Duffy, M. The Battle of Messines Ridge 1917

Military history of Belgium during World War I
History of Flanders
World War I memorials in Belgium
Ypres Salient